Hama, courtesy name was a Hui Kankali official and Tibetan monk in the Yuan dynasty who served as chief minister to the Emperor Shun. 

After Toktagha's disgrace Hama was created first minister and Sue sue, his brother, chief censor of the Empire.  Hama was made first minister and all power was then in his hands. Elated by this success, Hama decided to raise Ayushiridara to the throne. This plot was discovered, Hama was sentenced to exile and strangled by his enemies there in 1356, and Ayushiridara was pardoned.

References

Yuan dynasty left chancellors
14th-century Buddhist monks
1356 deaths